Histopona egonpretneri is a funnel-web spider species found in Croatia.

See also 
 List of Agelenidae species

References

External links 

Histopona
Spiders of Europe
Spiders described in 1983